Berg is a village in the commune of Betzdorf, in eastern Luxembourg.  , the village had a population of 88.  It is the administrative centre of Betzdorf commune.

Betzdorf, Luxembourg
Villages in Luxembourg